Wayne Williams (born 1958) is a convicted murderer.

Wayne Williams may also refer to:

Wayne W. Williams (born 1963), American attorney and politician
Wayne Williams (American football) (1921–2001), college football running back
Wayne Williams, member of English boyband Another Level
Wayne Williams, member of Maltese band Firelight